Karnow may refer to:
Stanley Karnow, American journalist
Karnow, Iran, a village in East Azerbaijan Province, Iran